The Anna Town Hall is a historic brick town hall in Anna, Ohio, United States.  Built in 1880, it originally included space for the village offices, a jail, a fire station, and a community theater.  The building's brick architecture presents a stark contrast to the majority of buildings in the village, which includes primarily frame structures.

Although the first settlers in the vicinity of modern Anna arrived in 1833, the village was started a quarter century later; it was platted in 1858 by landowner John W. Carey and named for his daughter, Anna Carey.  Shortly after the village incorporated in 1877, the need for a community government building became apparent, and the present structure was erected on the main road from the canal town of Minster to a rail line operated by a predecessor of the Baltimore and Ohio Railroad.  In recognition of its place in local history and of its well-preserved historic architecture, the Anna Town Hall was listed on the National Register of Historic Places in 1978.

References

External links
Village website

National Register of Historic Places in Shelby County, Ohio
Government buildings completed in 1880
Fire stations on the National Register of Historic Places in Ohio
Jails on the National Register of Historic Places in Ohio
City and town halls on the National Register of Historic Places in Ohio
Buildings and structures in Shelby County, Ohio
Theatres on the National Register of Historic Places in Ohio
1880 establishments in Ohio